Stratiomys obesa is a species of soldier fly in the family Stratiomyidae.

References

Further reading

 

Stratiomyidae
Articles created by Qbugbot
Insects described in 1866